Buddy's Beer Garden is a 1933 Warner Bros. Looney Tunes cartoon, directed by Jack King. The short was released on November 11, 1933, and stars Buddy, the second star of the series.

It was supervised by Earl Duvall, here credited as "Duval," was one of only five Warner Bros. cartoons directed by him, and one of only three Buddy shorts. Musical direction was by Norman Spencer.

Summary
We enter Buddy's beer garden, where are gathered many merry patrons, singing "Oh du lieber Augustin", mugs in hand. The happy opening scene fades to one of an equally merry Buddy, who balances a tray and sings of the good cheer his beer brings (to the tune of "Auf Wiederseh'n (We'll Meet Again)"), as he fixes a tablecloth and sets down two glasses of his ware, while a black dog, pretzels on its tail, behind him barks in tune. A German oom-pah band creates an ambience (and, as the band reappears four times throughout the cartoon, each time they are seen, as a gag, a small member of the group will come out of the largest member's brass instrument, playing, in succession, a trumpet, maracas, a piano, and a bass drum.) Beer flows on tap, and Buddy ensures that each mug has plenty of foam. Cookie neatly prepares several pretzels, which then are salted by the same little dachshund, and carried thence away. The tongue sandwiches offered as part of the bar's free lunch sing & lap up mustard; an impatient patron (presumably the same brute who serves as the villain in later shorts, such as Buddy's Show Boat and Buddy's Garage) demands his beer, which he instantly gulps down upon its arrival.

All present take part in "It's Time to Sing 'Sweet Adeline' Again": some sing, one patron plays his spaghetti as though the noodles were strings on a harp, Buddy makes an instrument out of his steins, &c. Cookie comes around, offering cigars and cigarettes to the patrons, one of whom, the same impatient brute as before, accepts, but not before freshly stroking the girl's chin. Cookie performs an exotic dance for the entire beer garden, and is joined by the selfsame patron, & a formerly stationery piano. The film goes on: Buddy whistles "Hi Lee Hi Lo", tossing beer from one mug to another, preparing sandwiches, clearing tables.

As a final treat for his customers, Our Hero introduces a lady singer (who bears a striking resemblance to Mae West), who reveals herself only after Buddy's departure and a brief musical interlude. The grand dame attracts the attention of the very same recurring patron, who drunkenly stumbles over to her with the intention of receiving a kiss: as the song ("I Love my Big Time, Slow Time Baseball Man") ends, he makes his request, but a horned goat, part of a poster advertising "Bock Beer", but nonetheless quite alive, with its horns stabs the patron's backside, sending him flying. The patron, on his airborne journey, causes the lady singer to catch her dress on an overhanging tree; the dress tears, & the throaty performer, now grounded, is revealed to be a cross-dressed Buddy. Pleasantly embarrassed, Buddy stalks away, waving blithely to all present; in the final shot, we see that the bird cage strapped to Buddy's posterior (there to replicate the voluptuousness of his singing persona), in fact houses an exotic bird, which shows itself to have a voice & nose like those of Jimmy Durante, as well as a saying: "Am I mortified!"

Home media
The cartoon is available on the Looney Tunes Golden Collection: Volume 6. Along with Buddy's Day Out and Buddy's Circus, it is one of only three Buddy shorts released on DVD.

References

External links
 

1933 films
1933 animated films
1930s LGBT-related films
American black-and-white films
Cross-dressing in American films
Films scored by Norman Spencer (composer)
Films directed by Earl Duvall
Buddy (Looney Tunes) films
Looney Tunes shorts
Warner Bros. Cartoons animated short films
1930s Warner Bros. animated short films